Connecticut's 92nd House of Representatives district elects one member of the Connecticut House of Representatives. It encompasses parts of New Haven and has been represented by Democrat Patricia Dillon since 1985.

Recent elections

2020

2018

2016

2014

2012

References

92